Kagiso Kilego (born 26 September 1983) is a Botswana sprinter who specializes in the 400 metres.

He was a member of the Botswana 4 x 400 metres relay team that finished eighth at the 2004 Olympic Games. He also helped win this event at the 2003 All-Africa Games in a national record time of 3:02.24 minutes, together with teammates California Molefe, Oganeditse Moseki and Johnson Kubisa. 
He was also a member of the Westfield, NJ swim team.

External links
 

1983 births
Living people
Botswana male sprinters
Athletes (track and field) at the 2004 Summer Olympics
Olympic athletes of Botswana
African Games gold medalists for Botswana
African Games medalists in athletics (track and field)
Athletes (track and field) at the 2003 All-Africa Games